The 2021 Hiroshima gubernatorial election was held to elect the Governor of Hiroshima Prefecture, Japan, on 14 November 2021. 

Hidehiko Yuzaki, incumbent since 2009, was eligible to run and won re-election with nearly 90% of votes.

Results

References

2021 elections in Japan